Arthur Eugster (5 April 1863 – 7 January 1922) was a Swiss politician of Appenzell Ausserrhoden, President of the Swiss National Council for the year 1915/1916.

External links

Members of the National Council (Switzerland)
Presidents of the National Council (Switzerland)
Free Democratic Party of Switzerland politicians
1863 births
1922 deaths